Shane O'Donoghue (born 24 November 1992) is an Irish field hockey player who holds the prestigious accolade of Ireland's record goal scorer with 110 goals to date. He is the player-coach for his boyhood club Glennane and plays in the midfield for both Glenanne and the  Irish national team.

With the Irish national team, he competed at the 2016 Summer Olympics where he scored three goals. At the 2018 World Cup, O'Donoghue set the new record as career top goal scorer for Ireland, surpassing the 93 goals scored by John Jermyn; he has continued adding to the record, which he has increased to 110 goals.

Club career
He played club hockey for KHC Dragons in Belgium, which he rejoined in 2018 after having played for them between 2014 and 2016. After the 2019–20 season he returned to Glennane in Ireland.

References

External links

Hockey Ireland profile

1992 births
Living people
Irish male field hockey players
Male field hockey forwards
Olympic field hockey players of Ireland
Field hockey players at the 2016 Summer Olympics
2018 Men's Hockey World Cup players
KHC Dragons players
People educated at The High School, Dublin
Sportspeople from Dublin (city)
Men's Irish Hockey League players
Ireland international men's field hockey players
Men's Belgian Hockey League players